Ballinroad is a village approximately 3 km from Dungarvan, County Waterford on the south coast of Ireland. Ballinroad grew rapidly during the Celtic tiger era and is now one of Dungarvan's main dormitory areas.

Religion
Saint Lawrence's Catholic Church, c.1835, is located at Ballinroad Crossroads.

Sport
Dungarvan golf club is based in Knocknagranagh, Ballinroad .

Dungarvan Rugby Club is based in Ballyrandle, Ballinroad.

Ballinroad Football Club has been part of the community since 1971, with under-age and junior teams competing in the local Waterford league. The club's first team gained promotion to the Premier League for the first time ever in 2019.

See also
 List of towns and villages in Ireland

References

External links
 Golf Club
 Parish Website
 Saint Lawrence's Cemetery

Towns and villages in County Waterford